Tunnel Number 41, or the Big Hole, is a single-track railway tunnel underneath Mount Judah in the Sierra Nevada, near Norden, California. It is owned by Union Pacific Railroad, in service as a part of the Roseville Subdivision of the Overland Route. Daily freight trains as well as Amtrak's California Zephyr utilize the line.

The new and old single track routes were used in tandem as a double-tracked route until the old route was abandoned in 1993. The line is capable of transporting double-stacked containers.

See also
List of tunnels documented by the Historic American Engineering Record in California
Tunnel motors — locomotives designed to cope with long tunnels, especially those in the Sierra Nevada
EMD SD40T-2
EMD SD45T-2

References

External links

Union Pacific Railroad tunnels
Southern Pacific Railroad
Sierra Nevada (United States)
Railroad tunnels in California
1925 establishments in California
1925 in rail transport
Historic American Engineering Record in California
Tunnels completed in 1925